Dieter Wüest is a Swiss curler.

At the national level, he is a Swiss men's (1993) and mixed (2002) champion curler.

Teams

Men's

Mixed

References

External links
 
 
 Dieter Wüst in Volketswil - Auskünfte | Moneyhouse

Living people
Swiss male curlers
Swiss curling champions
Year of birth missing (living people)